Kuda or KUDA may refer to:

 Kakatiya Urban Development Authority, a planning agency in Warangal, Telangana, India
 Mitsubishi Freeca, a compact MPV/SUV, rebadged as Mitsubishi Kuda in Indonesia
 Kuda, a village in Dimapur District, Nagaland, India
 KUDA, a defunct radio station (88.7 FM) formerly licensed to serve Shoshoni, Wyoming, United States
 Kuda Bank, a London-based Nigerian-operating digital-only bank